Kelly Boucher (born 13 January 1968 in Calgary, Alberta) is a Canadian former basketball player who competed in the 1996 Summer Olympics and in the 2000 Summer Olympics. She also played for the Charlotte Sting of the Women's National Basketball Association (WNBA). During the 1998 WNBA season, Boucher became the first Canadian to play in the league.

Awards and honors
Top 100 U Sports women's basketball Players of the Century (1920-2020).

References

1968 births
Living people
Basketball people from Alberta
Basketball players at the 1996 Summer Olympics
Basketball players at the 2000 Summer Olympics
Canadian expatriate basketball people in the United States
Canadian women's basketball players
Charlotte Sting players
Olympic basketball players of Canada
Sportspeople from Calgary